Arnold Allen (born 22 January 1994) is an English professional mixed martial artist. He currently competes in the Featherweight division in the Ultimate Fighting Championship (UFC). As of November 8, 2022, he is #4 in the UFC featherweight rankings.

Background
Born and raised in Suffolk, Allen began training in mixed martial arts as a teenager and took part in several amateur fights before turning professional in 2012.

Mixed martial arts career

Early career
He made his professional debut competing as a featherweight for various regional promotions across Great Britain, including a stint in Cage Warriors.  He was able to compile a record of 9–1 in his first three years along the way.

After his TKO stoppage of Paul Cook in November 2014, Allen signed with the UFC.

Ultimate Fighting Championship 
Allen made his promotional debut on 20 June 2015 as a short notice replacement filling in for an injured Mike Wilkinson against Alan Omer at UFC Fight Night 69. After probably dropping the first two rounds, Allen won the fight via submission in the third round. He was also awarded a Performance of the Night bonus.

Allen next faced Yaotzin Meza on 27 February 2016 at UFC Fight Night 84. He won the fight by unanimous decision.

Allen was expected to face Mirsad Bektic on 8 October 2016 at UFC 204. However, due to injury, Allen withdrew from the fight and was replaced by Russell Doane.

Allen faced Makwan Amirkhani on 18 March 2017 at UFC Fight Night 107. He won the fight by split decision.

Allen was scheduled to face Enrique Barzola at UFC 220 on 20 January 2018. However, Allen was pulled from the fight on January 11 due to alleged visa issues which restricted his ability to travel. Following this announcement, It was determined that Allen would be replaced by Matt Bessette at UFC 220.

Allen faced Mads Burnell on 27 May 2018 at UFC Fight Night 130. He won the fight via front choke submission in the third round. This win earned him the Performance of the Night award.

Allen was expected to face Gilbert Melendez on 30 November 2018 at The Ultimate Fighter 28 Finale. However, Melendez pulled out of the fight on 5 November and was replaced by Ricky Glenn. In turn, Allen pulled out of the fight on 16 November citing a cut he received while training.

Allen faced Jordan Rinaldi on 16 March 2019 at UFC Fight Night 147. He won the fight by unanimous decision.

Allen faced Gilbert Melendez on 6 July 2019 at UFC 239. He won the fight via unanimous decision.

Allen was expected to face Josh Emmett on 25 January 2020 at UFC Fight Night 166. However Emmett was pulled from the event for an undisclosed reason, and he was replaced by  Nik Lentz whose original featherweight opponent also dropped out of the event. Allen won the fight via unanimous decision. Lentz would later claim he lost 40% of his vision after being poked in the eye by Allen.

Allen was scheduled to face Jeremy Stephens on 7 November 2020 at UFC on ESPN: Santos vs. Teixeira. However, Stephens was forced to withdraw from the event, citing injury. In turn, the bout was cancelled.

Allen faced Sodiq Yusuff on 10 April 2021 at UFC on ABC 2. After knocking Yusuff down twice, he won the fight via unanimous decision.

Allen faced Dan Hooker at UFC Fight Night 204. He won the fight via technical knockout in the first round. With this win, he received the Performance of the Night award.

Allen faced Calvin Kattar on October 29, 2022 at UFC Fight Night 213, winning via technical knockout following a knee injury to Kattar.

Allen is scheduled to face Max Holloway on April 15, 2023 at UFC on ESPN 44.

Personal life
Allen was issued a five-month suspended sentence after he pleaded guilty to affray, for his role in a 23 December 2016 brawl near Ipswich which left a man and five women injured. As a result, Allen could face travel restrictions due to the conviction.

Championships and accomplishments
Ultimate Fighting Championship
Performance of the Night (Three times) 
 Tied (Alexander Volkanovski) for the second longest win streak in UFC Featherweight division history (10)

Mixed martial arts record

|-
|Win
|align=center|19–1
|Calvin Kattar
|TKO (knee injury) 
|UFC Fight Night: Kattar vs. Allen
|
|align=center|2
|align=center|0:08
|Las Vegas, Nevada, United States
|
|-
|Win
|align=center|18–1
|Dan Hooker
|TKO (punches and elbows)
|UFC Fight Night: Volkov vs. Aspinall
|
|align=center|1
|align=center|2:33
|London, England
| 
|-
|Win
|align=center|17–1
|Sodiq Yusuff
|Decision (unanimous)
|UFC on ABC: Vettori vs. Holland
|
|align=center|3
|align=center|5:00
|Las Vegas, Nevada, United States
|
|-
|Win
|align=center|16–1
|Nik Lentz
|Decision (unanimous)
|UFC Fight Night: Blaydes vs. dos Santos 
|
|align=center|3
|align=center|5:00
|Raleigh, North Carolina, United States
|
|-
|Win
|align=center|15–1
|Gilbert Melendez
|Decision (unanimous)
|UFC 239 
|
|align=center|3
|align=center|5:00
|Las Vegas, Nevada, United States
|
|-
|Win
|align=center|14–1
|Jordan Rinaldi
|Decision (unanimous)
|UFC Fight Night: Till vs. Masvidal 
|
|align=center|3
|align=center|5:00
|London, England
|
|-
|Win
|align=center|13–1
|Mads Burnell
|Submission (front choke)
|UFC Fight Night: Thompson vs. Till
|
|align=center|3
|align=center|2:41
|Liverpool, England
|
|-
|Win
|align=center|12–1
|Makwan Amirkhani
|Decision (split)
|UFC Fight Night: Manuwa vs. Anderson
|
|align=center|3
|align=center|5:00
|London, England
|
|-
|Win
|align=center|11–1
|Yaotzin Meza
|Decision (unanimous)
|UFC Fight Night: Silva vs. Bisping
|
|align=center|3
|align=center|5:00
|London, England
|
|-
|Win
|align=center|10–1
|Alan Omer
|Submission (guillotine choke)
|UFC Fight Night: Jędrzejczyk vs. Penne
|
|align=center|3
|align=center|1:41
|Berlin, Germany
|
|-
|Win
|align=center|9–1
|Paul Cook
|TKO (doctor stoppage)
|M4TC 15
|
|align=center|2
|align=center|5:00
|Tyne and Wear, England
|
|-
|Win
|align=center|8–1
|Gaetano Pirello
|Decision (unanimous)
|CWFC 71
|
|align=center|3
|align=center|5:00
|Amman, Jordan
|
|-
|Loss
|align=center|7–1
|Marcin Wrzosek
|Decision (unanimous)
|CWFC 69
|
|align=center|3
|align=center|5:00
|London, England
|
|-
|Win
|align=center|7–0
|Tobias Huber
|TKO (punches)
|CWFC Fight Night 11
|
|align=center|1
|align=center|0:37
|Amman, Jordan
|
|-
|Win
|align=center|6–0
|Doni Miller
|TKO (punches)
|CWFC 61
|
|align=center|2
|align=center|0:34
|Amman, Jordan
|
|-
|Win
|align=center|5–0
|Declan Williams
|Submission (triangle choke)
|CWFC 60
|
|align=center|2
|align=center|4:50
|North London, England
|
|-
|Win
|align=center|4–0
|Andy Green
|Submission (rear-naked choke)
|CWFC 56
|
|align=center|1
|align=center|4:00
|London, England
|
|-
|Win
|align=center|3–0
|Carl Orriss
|Decision (unanimous)
|UCMMA 32
|
|align=center|3
|align=center|5:00
|London, England
|
|-
|Win
|align=center|2–0
|Kim Thinghaugen
|TKO (doctor stoppage)
|UWC 21
|
|align=center|1
|align=center|5:00
|Southend-on-Sea, England
|
|-
|Win
|align=center|1–0
|Nathan Greyson
|KO (punch)
|UCMMA 27
|
|align=center|2
|align=center|0:40
|London, England
|
|}

References

External links
 
 

1994 births
English practitioners of Brazilian jiu-jitsu
Sportspeople from Ipswich
Featherweight mixed martial artists
Living people
English male mixed martial artists
English male kickboxers
English male boxers
Lightweight mixed martial artists
Bantamweight mixed martial artists
Mixed martial artists utilizing boxing
Mixed martial artists utilizing kickboxing
Mixed martial artists utilizing Brazilian jiu-jitsu
Ultimate Fighting Championship male fighters